The 2007–08 season was Nottingham Forest's third consecutive season in League One. The season was regarded a success with the team gaining promotion back to the Championship at the third attempt.

Forest's players were also successful on an individual level in the 2007–08 season, with Julian Bennett and Kris Commons in the PFA League One Team of the Year, while Paul Smith ended the season with 24 clean sheets in 46 games, the record for the league in that season. This achievement was recognised when he received the Puma Golden Glove award.

Team kit

|

|

|

Season overview
In the 2007–08 campaign, Forest were named title favourites for the third consecutive year. Calderwood signed five players in summer 2007, most notably former Celtic captain Neil Lennon on a free transfer.  Also captured were left-back Matt Lockwood from Leyton Orient, Preston North End defender Kelvin Wilson and Yeovil Town duo midfielder Chris Cohen and attacking winger Arron Davies all signing for undisclosed fees.

Forest started the 2007–08 campaign by failing to win in their first six competitive games.  The Reds drew three times and lost 2–1 at home to rivals Leeds United, as well as losing 3–2 to Peterborough United in the Football League Trophy. However, Forest then hit an eight-game unbeaten run in the league (including five wins), scoring seventeen goals in the process. After losing to Luton, Forest went on another unbeaten run, this time of six games in all competitions. This briefly took Forest to the top of the league table over Christmas, the first time they had been top all season.

But they lost top spot as they failed to win away from home, in a run lasting seven games.  After moving back into second place, Forest's away form once again was found lacking, which allowed Carlisle and Doncaster to overtake them into second and third place, respectively.  Forest went on to collect just one win in seven games.

However, they turned their form around, and after being 11 points behind second-place at one point.  A win Carlisle saw Forest then win six out of their last seven games of the season.  Forest, who had only been in the automatic promotion places once all season got promoted to the Championship on a dramatic last day of the season, by beating Yeovil 3–2 at the City Ground to secure second place. The Reds kept a league record of 24 clean sheets out of 46 games, which helped them end their three-year spell in the league's third tier and gain their first promotion in ten years.

Pre-season and Friendlies

Results

League One

Results

League table

FA Cup

Results

League Cup

Results

Football League Trophy

Results

Squad statistics

Appearances and Goals
The statistics for the following players are for their time during 2007–08 season playing for Nottingham Forest. Any stats from a different club during 2007–08 are not included.
Grant Holt's red card was for two yellow cards
Nottingham Forest also had two own goals scored for them during 2007–08

Transfers

In

Out

Loan In

Loan Out

Nottingham Forest F.C. seasons
Nottingham Forest